Phil O'Brien may refer to:
 Phil O'Brien, pen name of Irish dramaturge Philomena Muinzer
 Phil O'Brien, Australian writer, musician and filmmaker who made a film in Nhulunbuy, Northern Territory
 Phil O'Brien, past president of the New York Press Club, 1993-94
 Phil O'Brien (athlete), competed in the 1983 IAAF World Cross Country Championships – Senior men's race
 Phil O'Brien (entrepreneur), former photographer, founder of EMPICS in 1985
 Phil O'Brien (footballer) (1930–2020), Australian rules football player
 Phil O'Brien (motorcyclist), Australian motorcyclist in the 1969 Grand Prix motorcycle racing season, 500cc race